Saregou is a town in the Boussouma Department of Boulgou Province in south-eastern Burkina Faso. As of a census held in 2005, the town had a population of 551.

References

Populated places in the Centre-Est Region
Boulgou Province